Katherine "Kate" Psota (born April 30, 1986) is a Canadian former competitor with the Wilfrid Laurier Golden Hawks women's ice hockey program. She was a member of the Canada women's national baseball team that won a silver medal at the 2015 Pan American Games.

Career

Hockey
Psota played collegiate hockey for the Laurier Golden Hawks from 2006–10, she won an OUA conference title in every season. Earning CIS Academic All-Canadian honours in 2009, her final game with the Golden Hawks was the bronze medal game at the 2010 CIS National Championships, a 4-0 victory against Saint Mary’s.

Baseball
Psota and teammate Ashley Stephenson have both participated with the Canadian national women’s baseball team in every IBAF World Cup since 2004. Between 2004 and 2014, they have claimed four medals in six tournaments, three bronze and one silver medal which was attained in 2008.
Earning Canadian national women’s baseball team MVP honours in 2009 and 2010, she was also recognized as a World Cup All-Star in 2010 and 2012.

Awards and honours

Hockey
 2009 CIS Academic All-Canadian
 2010 Bronze Medal, CIS National Championships

Baseball
 Canadian National Women’s Baseball Team MVP Award (2009, 2010)
 2010 IBAF World Cup Tournament All-Star (First Base)
 2011 Jimmy Rattlesnake Award
 2012 IBAF World Cup Tournament All-Star (First Base)

Personal
In 2010, she graduated from Wilfrid Laurier University with a Bachelor of Arts in geography and kinesiology. The following year, Psota had obtained a Bachelor of Arts in education.

References

1986 births
Canadian female baseball players
Baseball people from Ontario
Canadian women's ice hockey players
Ice hockey people from Ontario
Living people
Sportspeople from Burlington, Ontario
Wilfrid Laurier University alumni
Baseball players at the 2015 Pan American Games
Pan American Games silver medalists for Canada
Pan American Games medalists in baseball
Medalists at the 2015 Pan American Games